Renee Burgess is a Democratic Party politician who was selected in September 2022 to fill the seat in the New Jersey Senate representing New Jersey's 28th legislative district that had been held by Ronald Rice until he left office due to health issues after serving 35 years in office.

A resident of Irvington, Burgess had served on the Irvington Township Council until she was appointed to the Senate by a special convention of Essex County Democrats. Burgess is the first State Senator from Irvington.

New Jersey Senate

District 28 
Each of the 40 districts in the New Jersey Legislature has one representative in the New Jersey Senate and two members in the New Jersey General Assembly. The representatives from the 28th District for the 2022—23 Legislative Session are:
 Senator Renee Burgess (D)
 Assemblyman Ralph R. Caputo (D)
 Assemblyman Cleopatra Tucker (D)

References

External links
Legislative webpage

Living people
New Jersey city council members
Democratic Party members of the New Jersey General Assembly
People from Irvington, New Jersey
Politicians from Essex County, New Jersey
Year of birth missing (living people)